Chierika "Coco" Ukogu (born 2 October 1992) is an American-born Nigerian professional rower. During the 2015 FISA African Olympic Qualification Regatta, she qualified to represent Nigeria at the 2016 Summer Olympics in Rio de Janeiro, Brazil, making her the first Nigerian to achieve such feat. In order to compete in Rio, she raised $15,000 through her GoFundMe page and went on to reach the semi-finals C/D, a non-medal contention round; after placing 5th in her group.

References

External links
Chierika Ukogu at World Rowing

1992 births
Living people
Rowers from Philadelphia
Nigerian female rowers
Rowers at the 2016 Summer Olympics
Olympic rowers of Nigeria
Nigerian expatriates in the United States
Stanford University alumni